Chrysometa is a genus of long-jawed orb-weavers that was first described by Eugène Louis Simon in 1894. It is a senior synonym of Capichameta.

Species
 it contains 146 species, found in the Caribbean, Central America, South America, and Mexico:
C. acinosa Álvarez-Padilla, 2007 – Chile
C. adelis Levi, 1986 – Colombia
C. alajuela Levi, 1986 – Costa Rica to Colombia
C. alboguttata (O. Pickard-Cambridge, 1889) – Mexico to Colombia
C. allija Levi, 1986 – Ecuador
C. antonio Levi, 1986 – Colombia
C. aramba Levi, 1986 – Brazil
C. atotonilco Salgueiro-Sepúlveda & Álvarez-Padilla, 2018 – Mexico
C. aureola (Keyserling, 1884) – Brazil, Trinidad
C. banos Levi, 1986 – Ecuador
C. bella (Banks, 1909) – Costa Rica
C. bigibbosa (Keyserling, 1864) – Colombia
C. bolivari Levi, 1986 – Ecuador
C. bolivia Levi, 1986 – Bolivia, Colombia
C. boquete Levi, 1986 – Panama, Colombia
C. boraceia Levi, 1986 – Brazil, Paraguay, Uruguay
C. brevipes (O. Pickard-Cambridge, 1889) – Mexico, Guatemala
C. browni Levi, 1986 – Ecuador
C. buenaventura Levi, 1986 – Colombia
C. buga Levi, 1986 – Colombia
C. butamalal Levi, 1986 – Chile
C. cali Levi, 1986 – Colombia
C. calima Levi, 1986 – Colombia
C. cambara Levi, 1986 – Brazil
C. candianii Nogueira, Pena-Barbosa, Venticinque & Brescovit, 2011 – Brazil
C. carmelo Levi, 1986 – Colombia
C. cebolleta Levi, 1986 – Colombia
C. chica Levi, 1986 – Ecuador
C. chipinque Levi, 1986 – Mexico, Guatemala
C. choroni Levi, 1986 – Venezuela
C. chulumani Levi, 1986 – Bolivia
C. churitepui Levi, 1986 – Venezuela
C. citlaltepetl Salgueiro-Sepúlveda & Álvarez-Padilla, 2018 – Mexico
C. claudia Levi, 1986 – Venezuela
C. columbicola Strand, 1916 – Colombia
C. conspersa (Bryant, 1945) – Hispaniola
C. cornuta (Bryant, 1945) – Hispaniola
C. craigae Levi, 1986 – Costa Rica
C. cuenca Levi, 1986 – Ecuador
C. decolorata (O. Pickard-Cambridge, 1889) – Guatemala
C. digua Levi, 1986 – Colombia
C. distincta (Bryant, 1940) – Cuba
C. donachui Levi, 1986 – Colombia
C. duida Levi, 1986 – Venezuela
C. eberhardi Levi, 1986 – Colombia
C. ecarup Levi, 1986 – Colombia
C. eugeni Levi, 1986 – Martinique, St. Vincent
C. explorans (Chamberlin, 1916) – Peru
C. fidelia Levi, 1986 – Colombia
C. flava (O. Pickard-Cambridge, 1894) – Mexico to Brazil
C. flavicans (Caporiacco, 1947) – Brazil, Guyana, Suriname
C. fuscolimbata (Archer, 1958) – Jamaica
C. guadeloupensis Levi, 1986 – Guadeloupe
C. guttata (Keyserling, 1881) – Colombia, Venezuela, Peru, Brazil
C. hamata (Bryant, 1942) – Puerto Rico
C. heredia Levi, 1986 – Costa Rica
C. huanuco Levi, 1986 – Peru
C. huila Levi, 1986 – Colombia, Ecuador
C. incachaca Levi, 1986 – Colombia
C. itaimba Levi, 1986 – Brazil
C. jayuyensis (Petrunkevitch, 1930) – Puerto Rico
C. jelskii Levi, 1986 – Peru
C. jordao Levi, 1986 – Brazil
C. keyserlingi Levi, 1986 – Colombia
C. kochalkai Levi, 1986 – Colombia
C. lancetilla Levi, 1986 – Honduras
C. lapazensis Levi, 1986 – Bolivia
C. lepida (Keyserling, 1881) – Peru
C. levii Álvarez-Padilla, 2007 – Chile
C. linguiformis (Franganillo, 1930) – Cuba, Jamaica
C. lomanhungae Nogueira, Pena-Barbosa, Venticinque & Brescovit, 2011 – Brazil
C. ludibunda (Keyserling, 1893) – Brazil, Paraguay
C. luisi Levi, 1986 – Ecuador
C. machala Levi, 1986 – Ecuador, Peru
C. macintyrei Levi, 1986 – Ecuador
C. macuchi Levi, 1986 – Ecuador, Peru
C. maculata (Bryant, 1945) – Hispaniola
C. magdalena Levi, 1986 – Colombia
C. maitae Álvarez-Padilla, 2007 – Chile
C. malkini Levi, 1986 – Colombia
C. marta Levi, 1986 – Colombia
C. merida Levi, 1986 – Venezuela
C. minuta (Keyserling, 1883) – Brazil
C. minza Levi, 1986 – Ecuador
C. monticola (Keyserling, 1883) – Peru
C. muerte Levi, 1986 – Costa Rica to Colombia
C. niebla Levi, 1986 – Colombia
C. nigroventris (Keyserling, 1879) – Colombia or Panama
C. nigrovittata (Keyserling, 1865) – Colombia, Ecuador
C. nubigena Nogueira, Pena-Barbosa, Venticinque & Brescovit, 2011 – Brazil
C. nuboso Levi, 1986 – Costa Rica
C. nuevagranada Levi, 1986 – Colombia
C. obscura (Bryant, 1945) – Hispaniola
C. opulenta (Keyserling, 1881) – Peru, Brazil
C. otavalo Levi, 1986 – Ecuador
C. palenque Levi, 1986 – Mexico to Honduras
C. pecki Levi, 1986 – Jamaica
C. pena Simó, Álvarez & Laborda, 2016 – Uruguay
C. penai Levi, 1986 – Ecuador
C. petrasierwaldae Nogueira, Pena-Barbosa, Venticinque & Brescovit, 2011 – Brazil
C. pichincha Levi, 1986 – Ecuador
C. pilimbala Levi, 1986 – Colombia
C. plana Levi, 1986 – Ecuador
C. poas Levi, 1986 – Mexico to Panama
C. puebla Levi, 1986 – Mexico
C. purace Levi, 1986 – Colombia
C. puya Salgueiro-Sepúlveda & Álvarez-Padilla, 2018 – Mexico
C. ramon Levi, 1986 – Peru
C. raripila (Keyserling, 1893) – Brazil
C. rincon Levi, 1986 – Mexico
C. rosarium Salgueiro-Sepúlveda & Álvarez-Padilla, 2018 – Mexico
C. rubromaculata (Keyserling, 1864) – Colombia or Panama
C. sabana Levi, 1986 – Hispaniola
C. saci Nogueira, Pena-Barbosa, Venticinque & Brescovit, 2011 – Brazil
C. sagicuta Salgueiro-Sepúlveda & Álvarez-Padilla, 2018 – Mexico
C. saladito Levi, 1986 – Colombia
C. santosi Nogueira, Pena-Barbosa, Venticinque & Brescovit, 2011 – Brazil
C. saramacca Levi, 1986 – Venezuela, Peru, Suriname
C. satulla (Keyserling, 1881) – Peru
C. satura Levi, 1986 – Costa Rica
C. schneblei Levi, 1986 – Colombia, Ecuador
C. serachui Levi, 1986 – Colombia
C. sevillano Levi, 1986 – Colombia
C. sicki Levi, 1986 – Brazil
C. sondo Levi, 1986 – Colombia
C. sumare Levi, 1986 – Brazil
C. sztolcmani Levi, 1986 – Peru
C. tenuipes (Keyserling, 1864) (type) – Colombia
C. tinajillas Levi, 1986 – Ecuador
C. triangulosa Salgueiro-Sepúlveda & Álvarez-Padilla, 2018 – Mexico
C. troya Levi, 1986 – Ecuador
C. tungurahua Levi, 1986 – Ecuador
C. uaza Levi, 1986 – Ecuador, Colombia
C. unicolor (Keyserling, 1881) – Colombia or Panama
C. universitaria Levi, 1986 – Costa Rica, Panama
C. ura Levi, 1986 – Ecuador
C. utcuyacu Levi, 1986 – Peru
C. valle Levi, 1986 – Colombia
C. waikoxi Nogueira, Pena-Barbosa, Venticinque & Brescovit, 2011 – Brazil
C. xamaticpac Salgueiro-Sepúlveda & Álvarez-Padilla, 2018 – Mexico
C. xavantina Levi, 1986 – Brazil
C. yanomami Nogueira, Pena-Barbosa, Venticinque & Brescovit, 2011 – Brazil
C. yotoco Levi, 1986 – Colombia, Venezuela
C. yungas Levi, 1986 – Bolivia
C. yunque Levi, 1986 – Puerto Rico
C. zelotypa (Keyserling, 1883) – Costa Rica to Peru

In synonymy:
C. alticola (Berland, 1913, T from Meta) = Chrysometa zelotypa (Keyserling, 1883)
C. ribeiroi (Soares & Camargo, 1955) = Chrysometa guttata (Keyserling, 1881)
C. superans (O. Pickard-Cambridge, 1896) = Chrysometa alboguttata (O. Pickard-Cambridge, 1889)
C. uncata (F. O. Pickard-Cambridge, 1903) = Chrysometa brevipes (O. Pickard-Cambridge, 1889)

See also
 List of Tetragnathidae species

References

Araneomorphae genera
Spiders of Central America
Spiders of Mexico
Spiders of South America
Tetragnathidae